New Zealand competed at the World Games 2017 in Wroclaw, Poland, from July 20, 2017 to July, 30 2017. It will be New Zealand's tenth appearance at the World Games.

Competitors

Gymnastic

Trampoline
New Zealand has qualified at the 2017 World Games:

Women's Individual Double Mini Trampoline - 1 quota

Billiard Sports

Pool
Men's 9-Ball Pool Individual - 1 quota place (Matthew Edwards)
Women's 9-Ball Pool Individual - 1 quota place (Molrudee Kasemchaiyanan)

Karate

New Zealand has qualified at the 2017 World Games:

Women's Kata Individual – 1 quota place (Alexandrea Anacan)

Canoe Sports

Canoe Polo 
New Zealand has qualified at the 2017 World Games:

Men's Team Event - 1 quote place (Qualified at 2016 World Championships)
Women's Team Event - 1 quota place (Qualified at 2016 World Championships)

References 

Nations at the 2017 World Games
2017 in New Zealand sport
New Zealand at the World Games